Chokher Bali (চোখের বালি) is a 1903 Bengali novel by Rabindranath Tagore that depicts the life of the central character, Binodini, and her relationships with three individuals. It explores the extramarital affair between Binodini, a young widow, and Mahendra, one of the three other main characters, the complicated friendship with Asha, his girl-wife, and her mutually conflicting feelings with Behari, Mahendra's adopted brother. The content also highlighted issues of female literacy, child marriage, patriarchy within the family and the fates of three widows

Title
The title of the book can be translated as "a grain of sand", a "constant irritant to the eye", or an "eyesore". "Eyesore" was used as the title for its first English translation by Surendranath Tagore published in 1914. Tagore used Binodini as a working title before its publication.

Writing and publication history
Tagore prepared himself for writing the novel by writing a spree of short stories and it was his first serious effort at a novel. He began working on the novel in 1898 or 1899, and a draft version was completed in 1901.

It was first serialized from 1902 to 1903 in the periodical Bangadarshan, then published as a full book in 1903. Some passages were deleted in the initial serialization and publication, but partly restored in the anthology Rabindra Rachanabali published in 1941, with more restored in an independent edition in 1947.

Translation and adaptations

The first translation of Chokher Bali was by Surendranath Tagore which appeared in The Modern Review in 1914. It was then translated into English by Krishna Kripalani, and published under the title of Binodini in 1959 by the Sahitya Akademi. It has also been translated into other non-Indian languages including Russian (1959) and Chinese (1961); and into most of the Indian languages including Hindi, Gujarati, Kannada, Malayalam, Marathi, Punjabi, Sindhi, Tamil, Telugu, Assamese (translated by Dr. Mahendra Bora, published by Sahitya Akademi in 1968) and Urdu. A transliteration in Devanagari script, with footnotes in Hindi, was also published by the Sahitya Akademi in 1961.

Chokher Bali has been adapted a number of times in film, television and theatre. A stage adaptation was first performed in 1904, and a film version directed by Satu Sen was released in 1938, which Tagore saw and he expressed his satisfaction with the performance in the film. Other versions have been produced on screen and television, for example, Chokher Bali by Rituparno Ghosh in 2003, and in the television series Stories by Rabindranath Tagore in 2015. The Indian Bengali-language television serial Chokher Bali, which aired on Zee Bangla from 2015 to 2016, was adapted from the novel.

References

 
Indian novels adapted into films